Ghazi Wazni (Arabic: غازي وزني, born 1954) is a Lebanese Shiite politician who served as Minister of Finance in the cabinet of Hassan Diab from 21 January to 10 September 2021.

Biography 
Wazni was born in Bint Jbeil in 1954. He graduated from Paris Dauphine University in Paris, France, and earned a PhD in 1983.

References 

Living people
1954 births
People from Bint Jbeil District
Finance ministers of Lebanon
Paris Dauphine University alumni
Amal Movement politicians